Saint-Georges-des-Sept-Voies is a former commune in the Maine-et-Loire department in western France. On 1 January 2016, it was merged into the new commune of Gennes-Val-de-Loire. Its population was 666 in 2019.

See also
Communes of the Maine-et-Loire department

References

Saintgeorgesdesseptvoies